The Organization of Saudi Communists was a political party in Saudi Arabia. The OSC was formed in Beirut by communists involved in the Arab National Liberation Movement; a coalition of Saudi opposition groups, including Talal bin Abdulaziz Al Saud. The OSC was formed so that Saudi Communists could retain a degree of autonomy whilst still being involved with the larger Movement. Abdulaziz as-Sunaid was one of the founders of the organization. The group was short-lived, however, with most Saudi Communists remaining under the banner of the National Liberation Front(جبهة التحرير الوطني), which later morphed into the Communist Party in Saudi Arabia.

References

Banned communist parties
Communist parties in Saudi Arabia
Saudi Arabian opposition groups